This was the first edition of the tournament.

Andrey Golubev won the title, defeating Karen Khachanov 6–7(9–11), 7–6(7–5), 7–6(7–4) in the final.

Seeds

Draw

Finals

Top half

Bottom half

References
 Main Draw
 Qualifying Draw

RC Hotel Open - Singles